Parkersburg Bridge may refer to:

Parkersburg-Belpre Bridge
Memorial Bridge (Parkersburg, West Virginia)
Parkersburg Bridge (CSX)